Obaid is one romanization of the Arabic name also written Ubaid, Obeid. It is used as a masculine given name and a surname.

Given name
 Obaid Khalifa (born 1985), Emirati football player
 Obaid Mohamed (born 1979), Emirati football player
 Obaid Siddiqi (born 1932), Indian researcher

Surname
 Musa Amer Obaid, (born 1985), Qatari athlete
 Sharmeen Obaid-Chinay (born 1978) Pakistani journalist
 Thoraya Obaid (born 1945), Saudi Arabian politician and diplomat

See also
 Al-Ubaid (disambiguation), for other uses and various romanizations of the same name
 Ubaydul Haq (disambiguation) and variants

Given names